Fyodor Ivanovich Odinokov (—  19 February 1994) was a Soviet actor. He appeared in more than seventy films from 1938 to 1994.

Selected filmography

References

External links 

1913 births
1994 deaths
People from Tula Oblast
People from Odoyevsky Uyezd
Soviet male film actors
Honored Artists of the RSFSR
Burials at Vagankovo Cemetery